Andrieus Aristieus Jones (May 16, 1862December 20, 1927) was an American politician from New Mexico who represented the state in the United States Senate from 1917 until his death in 1927.

Early life and education
Jones was born in Obion County, Tennessee, near Union City on May 16, 1862, a son of Rev. James Henry Waldo Jones and Hester Ann Augusta (May) Jones. He was educated in the local schools, attended Bethel College in McKenzie, and graduated from Valparaiso University with a Bachelor of Science degree in 1884, and a Bachelor of Arts in 1885.

Career 
After college, Jones taught school in Tennessee before moving to Las Vegas, New Mexico Territory, where he was principal of the public schools from 1885 to 1887. While teaching, Jones studied law. He was admitted to the bar in 1888 and began practice in Las Vegas.

Jones served as president of the Las Vegas Chamber of Commerce, and from 1893 to 1894 he was president of the New Mexico Bar Association. From 1893 to 1894 he served as mayor of Las Vegas. From 1894 to 1898 he was a special United States Attorney. In 1896, Jones was a delegate to the Democratic National Convention.

From 1906 to 1908 and 1911 to 1912, he was chairman of the New Mexico Democratic Party. In 1908, Jones became New Mexico's member of the Democratic National Committee, and he served until 1922. Jones ran unsuccessfully for the Senate in 1912; from 1913 to 1916 he served as the first Assistant Secretary of the Interior.

Jones was elected to the Senate in 1916. He was reelected in 1922 and served from March 4, 1917, until his death. While in Congress he served on the Finance Committee and was chairman of the Committee on Woman Suffrage. As a member of the Committee on Public Lands and Surveys, Jones worked to uncover and publicize the details of the Teapot Dome Scandal.

Personal life
In 1902, Jones married Natalia (Stoneroad) Jones (1871–1933). They has two sons, Vincent and A. A. Jones Jr. Jones died in Washington, D.C., on December 20, 1927. He was buried in the Masonic Cemetery in Las Vegas, New Mexico.

See also
List of United States Congress members who died in office (1900–1949)

References

Sources

Books

Newspapers

External links

1862 births
1927 deaths
People from Obion County, Tennessee
Democratic Party United States senators from New Mexico
New Mexico Democrats
Mayors of places in New Mexico
People from Las Vegas, New Mexico
People from Union City, Tennessee
Bethel University (Tennessee) alumni
Valparaiso University alumni